Miłogost Reczek (10 February 1961 – 14 December 2021) was a Polish voice actor. He was known, among other roles, as the Polish dub voice for Homer Simpson in The Simpsons Movie, Felix the Cat in Baby Felix and as Vesemir and Thaler in The Witcher video games.

He dubbed various other films including Star Wars original trilogy, Despicable Me, Thomas and Friends, Monsters vs Aliens, as well as video games, like Cyberpunk 2077 and audio plays. 

Reczek died on 14 December 2021, at the age of 60.

References

1961 births
2021 deaths
20th-century Polish male actors
21st-century Polish male actors
Actors from Wrocław
Polish male voice actors